Galerucella nymphaeae, known generally as the water-lily beetle or water lily leaf beetle, is a species of skeletonizing leaf beetle in the family Chrysomelidae. It is found in North America and Europe.

References

Further reading

External links

 

Galerucinae
Articles created by Qbugbot
Beetles described in 1758
Taxa named by Carl Linnaeus